Private Snuffy Smith (reissued as Snuffy Smith, Yardbird) is a 1942 American army comedy film directed by Edward F. Cline and starring Bud Duncan as comic-strip character Snuffy Smith and Edgar Kennedy as his commanding officer. A sequel, Hillbilly Blitzkrieg, was released later in 1942 and also featured Duncan and Kennedy. The comic strip's characters Barney Google and Sparkplug the horse do not appear in the film.

Plot 
Envious of the pay of $30 per month and free khaki britches and gold buttons of his friend Don Elbie, Snuffy Smith joins the U.S. Army with his dog Mr. Carson concealed by an invisibility potion. His company first sergeant is Ed Cooper, a former revenue agent who had unsuccessfully attempted to locate and destroy Snuffy's still.

Don has invented a new rangefinder that he hopes may be of use to the army. General Rosewater hopes to test the rangefinder in war games with a rival general. A pair of fifth columnists hope to steal the rangefinder but are defeated by Snuffy's wife Lowizie, his invisible dog and his hillbilly neighbors.

Cast 
Bud Duncan as Snuffy Smith, Camp Yardbird
Edgar Kennedy as 1st Sgt. Ed Cooper
Sarah Padden as Lowizie Smith
J. Farrell MacDonald as Gen. Rosewater
Doris Linden as Cindy
Jimmie Dodd as Pvt. Don Elbie
Andria Palmer as Janie
Patrick McVey as Lloyd
Frank Austin as Saul

Soundtrack 
 "Time's a-Wastin" by Ole Olsen, Chic Johnson, Jay Livingston and Ray Evans, sung by Jimmie Dodd
"The Yard Bird" by Jimmie Dodd, sung by Jimmie Dodd
"I Don't Know What to Do Blues" by Jimmie Dodd, sung by Jimmie Dodd

External links 

1942 films
1942 romantic comedy films
Monogram Pictures films
Films directed by Edward F. Cline
Films based on comic strips
Live-action films based on comics
Military humor in film
American romantic comedy films
American black-and-white films
1940s English-language films
1940s American films